is a small asteroid and Mars trojan orbiting near the  of Mars (60 degrees behind Mars on its orbit).

Discovery, orbit and physical properties
 was first observed on 21 March 2003 by the Near-Earth Asteroid Tracking (NEAT) project at Palomar Observatory using the Samuel Oschin telescope and given the provisional designation . The object was subsequently lost and re-discovered on 31 October 2011 by the Mt. Lemmon Survey. 
Its orbit is characterized by low eccentricity (0.044), moderate inclination (18.7°) and a semi-major axis of 1.52 AU. Upon discovery, it was classified as Mars-crosser by the Minor Planet Center. Its orbit is well determined as it is currently (March 2013) based on 45 observations with a data-arc span of 3,146 days.  has an absolute magnitude of 19.3 which gives a characteristic diameter of 600 m.

Mars trojan and orbital evolution
Recent calculations indicate that it is a stable  Mars trojan with a libration period of 1300 yr and an amplitude of 18°. These values as well as its short-term orbital evolution are similar to those of 5261 Eureka. Its eccentricity oscillates mainly due to secular resonances with the Earth and the oscillation in inclination is likely driven by secular resonances with Jupiter.

Origin
Long-term numerical integrations show that its orbit is very stable on Gyr time-scales (1 Gyr = 1 billion years). As in the case of Eureka, calculations in both directions of time (4.5 Gyr into the past and 4.5 Gyr into the future) indicate that  may be a primordial object, perhaps a survivor of the planetesimal population that formed in the terrestrial planets region early in the history of the Solar System.

See also 
 5261 Eureka (1990 MB)

References 

Further reading
 2011 SC191 Pettarin, E., Vivona, M., McMillan, R. S., Pietschnig, M., Klein, M., Boattini, A., Gibbs, A. R., Ahern, J. D., Beshore, E. C., Garradd, G. J., Grauer, A. D., Hill, R. E., Kowalski, R. A., Larson, S. M., McNaught, R. H., Birtwhistle, P. 2011, Minor Planet Electronic Circular, 2011-T02.
Three new stable L5 Mars Trojans de la Fuente Marcos, C., de la Fuente Marcos, R. 2013, Monthly Notices of the Royal Astronomical Society: Letters, Vol. 432, Issue 1, pp. 31–35.
Orbital clustering of Martian Trojans: An asteroid family in the inner solar system? Christou, A. A. 2013, Icarus, Vol. 224, Issue 1, pp. 144–153.

External links 
  data at MPC.
 
 

Mars trojans

Minor planet object articles (unnumbered)
Astronomical objects discovered in 2003
20111031